Naweeha is the third studio album for the Egyptian singer Mohamed Hamaki. The album contains 10 songs, and he co-operates again with the songwriter Ayman Bahgat Amar, Ammir Ta'eimah and Mohamed A'ttef, and others in the music industry such as the composers Mohamed Yehya, Ramy Gamal, Mohamed El Nadi and Tamer Aly and the arrangers Tooma and Tamim. It is named after the popular song, Naweeha.

References

External links

 Naweeha Album on Nogomi.com

Arabic-language albums
2008 albums
Mohamed Hamaki albums